This page provides the summary of the first round qualifiers for the group stage of the Asian football qualifiers for 2008 Olympics. The matches in this round were held on 7 February 2007 (first leg) and 14 February 2007.

Matches 
The first legs were played on 7 February and the second legs on 14 February 2007. The aggregate winners advanced to the second round.

1 The first leg of the Vietnam–Afghanistan match in Hanoi was cancelled due to the Afghanistan team's financial problems that led to the team being unable to afford to travel to Vietnam, and security worries. FIFA rescheduled the single-tie match to 14 February 2007.

2 Withdrew

First leg 

Jordan automatically advanced to the Second Round as Kyrgyzstan withdrew.

Notes 
Note 1: The first leg of the Vietnam–Afghanistan match in Hanoi was cancelled due to the Afghanistan team's financial problems that led to the team being unable to afford to travel to Vietnam, and security worries. FIFA rescheduled the single-tie match to 14 February 2007.

Second leg 

Hong Kong won 3–1 on aggregate.

Vietnam won 2–0 on aggregate.

Indonesia won 1–0 on aggregate.

Pakistan won 5–3 on aggregate.

Thailand won 6–1 on aggregate.

Yemen won 3–2 on aggregate.

Australia won 12–0 on aggregate.

Uzbekistan won 6–1 on aggregate.

2–2 on aggregate. India won after penalties

References

External links 
 Official site of the AFC Men's Olympic Qualifiers

Afc, Men